Karachi Safari Park, opened in 1970, is a public funded 'family-only' safari park covering an area of , located in Gulshan-e-Iqbal, Karachi, Sindh, Pakistan. It has a zoo, geared with viewing facilities like a chairlift and safari tracks, as well as two natural lakes. A privately funded amusement park, Go Aish, is located in the Safari Park's vicinity.

History
Karachi Safari Park was inaugurated in 1970 by Lieutenant General Atiq-ur-Rehman. It was an independent project of the then Karachi Municipal Corporation. The creation of an independent zoo, safari and aquarium department followed in 1995. Karachi Safari Park is now an independent wing of the Community Development Department of City District Government of Karachi (defunct) and has been designated as a 'family park'.

Attractions

 Swan lake: A natural lake is located inside the safari park featuring a pagoda style sitting place.

 Chairlift: The 10 minutes long chairlift ride was set up at a cost of US$ 2 million and was inaugurated by the Karachi City Nazim Syed Mustafa Kamal on March 8, 2006.

 Go Aish: A private theme park featuring ropes course, paintball, quad biking, indoor climbing and a mini golf course.
 Elephant enclave: An enclave of about 65,000 square including a bathing space and resting area for the elephants has been constructed in the park for the joy of visitors and the elephants.
Kashmir Point: Kashmir Point is one of the newly built picnic spots in Safari Park. It was inaugurated by the Mayor of Karachi, Mr. Wasim Akhter. The scenic view from this picnic spot looks similar to the valleys of Kashmir, which is a rare sight in Karachi.

Future projects
 Aviary: In June 2012, administrator of KMC, Muhammad Hussain Syed, told The Nation (Pakistani newspaper) that the country's biggest aviary was being constructed speedily inside the safari park.
 Boating: In September 2012, it was announced that pedalo boating would be introduced in the lake.
 Camping site: A 300 acres of scouting land and camping area was also reported to be under development in October 2012.
 Museum: A 3,000 yards expanse will be used by Karachi Municipal Corporation to develop a unique museum for the endangered birds in Safari Park in accordance with the International Standards. This move will help raise awareness about the ongoing extinction alert for rare bird species.

See also 
 Lahore Zoo Safari
 List of parks and gardens in Pakistan
 List of parks and gardens in Lahore
 List of parks and gardens in Karachi

References

External links

1970 establishments in Pakistan
Zoos in Pakistan
Parks in Karachi
Amusement parks in Pakistan
Parks in Pakistan
Gulshan Town
Tourist attractions in Karachi
Wildlife parks in Pakistan